KZYP (1310 AM) is a radio station licensed to serve Malvern, Arkansas, United States. The station, which began broadcasting in 1951, is currently owned by Arkansas Rocks Radio Stations Network.  It was owned by Noalmark Broadcasting Corporation until 2014.

Until 2015, KBOK/KZYP broadcast a classic country format.  After losing ratings to US Stations, LLC's 104.5 The Bull, KZYP changed their format to regional Mexican.  On July 7, 2016, KZYP went silent.  On February 13, 2017, KZYP went back on the air with a sports radio format.  On April 29, 2017, KZYP went silent again.

The station was assigned the KBOK call sign by the Federal Communications Commission. The station changed to the current KZYP call sign on June 1, 2014.

Former logos

References

External links

ZYP
Radio stations established in 1951
Hot Spring County, Arkansas
ZYP
1951 establishments in Arkansas
Classic rock radio stations in the United States